This is a list of episodes of the Australian children's television series The Adventures of Blinky Bill.

Series overview
{| class="wikitable plainrowheaders" border="2" width="50%" style="text-align:center;"
! colspan="2" rowspan="2" | Season
! rowspan="2" | Episodes
! colspan="2" | Originally aired
|-
! Season premiere
! Season finale
|-
| style="background-color:#4CA93B;" |
| 1
| 26
| 
| 
|-
| style="background-color:#03C03C;" |
| 2
| 26
| 
| 
|-
| style="background-color:#2fce1f;" |
| 3
| 26
| 
| 
|-
|}

Episodes

Season 1 (1993)

Season 2 (1995)

Season 3 (2004)

TV movie

Blinky Bill
Blinky Bill